Füsun Eczacıbaşı (born Füsun Alpsoy) is a Turkish art collector and patron of the arts. She is the co-founder and chairperson of the SAHA Association for the Arts.

Personal history
Füsun Eczacıbaşı attended Kadikoy Maarif College and the Istanbul Academy of Fine Arts. She received her MSc in Architecture in 1986. Füsun Eczacıbaşı has been actively involved in many NGOs focusing on human rights, minority rights, nature preservation, and education. She is married to Faruk Eczacıbaşı, vice chairperson of Eczacıbaşı Holding, with whom she shares an enthusiasm for the arts. Their collection has been expanding since the late 1980s and focuses on contemporary art by emerging and established contemporary artists from Turkey and abroad. Füsun and Faruk Eczacıbaşı have two sons: Sinan (born in 1991) and Murat (born in 1995).

Patron of the arts
Eczacıbaşı is co-founder and chair of the SAHA Association in Istanbul, a non-profit organization in Turkey that supports contemporary art production. She is also co-chair of the New Museum International Leadership Council and a member of the Board of Trustees of the New Museum in New York City. Other art organizations she supports are the Global Patrons Council of Art Basel; International Friends of Castello di Rivoli, Turin; International Friends of Documenta, Kassel; International Council of Centre Pompidou, Paris; and Tate International Council Advisory Board, London. In February 2022, Füsun Eczacıbaşı was honored by the Madrid-based Callia Foundation with the International Patron Award. The award is supported by Queen Sophia of Spain, who attended the ceremony and presented the awards. Füsun Eczacıbaşı describes the SAHA Association, which celebrated its 10th anniversary in September 2021, as a place where "people with the intention of leaving a mark by supporting the development of production instead of consumption" meet.

References

External links
 "Saha". Retrieved 2021-02-01
 "Madrid Award Ceremony Royal Academy of Fine Arts of San Fernando". 22 February 2022
 "SAHA’nın görkemli 10 yılı.". 23 December 2022 
 "The New York Times | Ted Loos  interview". 19 October 2022
 "Art Basel Panel". 15 June 2022
 "Füsun Eczacıbaşı ile Sanat Üzerine". 18 April 2022
 "Art Basel Video". 28 May 2020
 "Dünya Interview". 29 May 2020
 "New Museum Press Release". 10 March 2020
 "Barbara Pollack “Füsun Eczacıbasi: Bringing Istanbul to the World,Art News". 23 July 2014
 “Salon: The Global Art World". 7 December 2012
 “Gareth Harris “Turkey’s booming art scene” Financial Times". 27 February 2010

People from Istanbul
Turkish architects
Turkish art patrons
Living people
Year of birth missing (living people)